Babki  is a village in the administrative district of Gmina Mosina, within Poznań County, Greater Poland Voivodeship, in west-central Poland. It is located in the historic region of Greater Poland.

The village has a population of 350.

References

Babki